Zhejiang Province is one of the smallest provinces (both in population and area) in China but quite well known for its academic prosperity and scholars. The province has produced a large number of distinguished scientists. In ancient time, such as Wang Chong of Han Dynasty, Shen Kuo of Song Dynasty, Huang Zongxi of Ming and Qing Dynasties from Zhejiang reached research climaxes of natural sciences in their own eras, however, this item would only focus on those modern scientists from Zhejiang.

Notations for memberships of academies
United States of America:
Foreign Member/Member of the United States National Academy of Sciences = FM/M-NAS
Foreign Member/Member of the United States National Academy of Engineering = FM/M-NAE
Foreign Member/Member of the Institute of Medicine of the United States National Academies = FM/M-IM
 Member/Fellow of the American Academy of Arts and Sciences = M/F-AAAS
Member of the New York Academy of Sciences = M-NYAS
 United Kingdom:
 Fellow of the Royal Society = FRS
 Fellow of the Royal Academy of Engineering = FRAE
 Fellow of the British Academy = FBA
 Fellow of the Royal Society of Edinburgh = FRSE
 Germany:
 Foreign Member of the German Academy of Sciences Leopoldina = FM-GASL
 Foreign Member of the Bavarian Academy of Sciences and Humanities = FM-BASH
 France:
 Foreign Member of the French Academy of Sciences = FM-FAS
 Russia:
 Foreign Member of the Russian Academy of Sciences = FM-RAS
 Foreign Member of the Russian Academy of Engineering = FM-RAE
 Republic of China/Taiwan:
 Academician/Member of the Academia Sinica = M-AS
 People's Republic of China:
 Foreign Member/Member of the Chinese Academy of Sciences = FM/M-CAS
 Foreign Member/Member of the Chinese Academy of Engineering = FM/M-CAE
 Other:
 Member of the Third World Academy of Sciences = M-TWAS
 Member of the International Academy of Astronautics = M-IAA

Notations for personal profiles
 Priority: Hometown > birthplace > study/work (based on traditional Chinese convention)
 Hometown: h.
 Birthplace: b.
 Have trained/studied in Zhejiang: s.
 Have worked in Zhejiang: w.

Introduction
In the historic first election (in 1948) of the Academia Sinica, about 1/4 academicians came from Zhejiang, the first two Presidents of the Academia Sinica (Cai Yuanpei and Chu Ka-Wa) also were born in Zhejiang. Currently Zhejiang has produced the most members of the Chinese Academy of Engineering (CAE), and the second most members of the Chinese Academy of Sciences (CAS), only after Jiangsu Province, where is also very famous for its scientific and technological tradition. Current CAS President Lu Yongxiang and CAE President Xu Kuangdi were both born in Zhejiang.

Many scientists and engineers have studied and/or worked at institutes of Zhejiang, such as Chien-Shiung Wu and Tsung-Dao Lee.

Outside of Chinese speaking regions, many academics of overseas Chinese have roots in Zhejiang.

Hometown Zhejiang

United States

Mainland China

Taiwan, Hong Kong, Macau

Birthplace Zhejiang

USA, UK, Canada, Australia, Singapore

Mainland China

Taiwan

Hong Kong & Macau

Studied/Worked in Zhejiang

United States

Mainland China

See also
 List of modern scientists from Jiangsu
 List of modern scientists from Shanghai

References